Paulo Roberto Rosales (born January 10, 1984 in Cosquín, Argentina) is an Argentine footballer currently playing for General Paz Juniors.

Honours

Club
Independiente
 Primera División (1): 2004

References
 
 

1984 births
Living people
Argentine footballers
Argentine expatriate footballers
Guillermo Brown footballers
Talleres de Córdoba footballers
Unión de Santa Fe footballers
Unión La Calera footballers
Olimpo footballers
Newell's Old Boys footballers
Esporte Clube Bahia players
Club Atlético Independiente footballers
Olympiacos Volos F.C. players
Santiago Wanderers footballers
Instituto footballers
Oriente Petrolero players
General Paz Juniors footballers
Argentine Primera División players
Chilean Primera División players
Primera B de Chile players
Bolivian Primera División players
Primera Nacional players
Torneo Argentino B players
Football League (Greece) players
Argentine expatriate sportspeople in Greece
Argentine expatriate sportspeople in Brazil
Argentine expatriate sportspeople in Chile
Expatriate footballers in Greece
Expatriate footballers in Brazil
Expatriate footballers in Chile
Association football midfielders